The 24th Punjabis were an infantry regiment of the British Indian Army. It was raised in 1857, as the 11th Regiment of Punjab Infantry. It was designated as the 24th Punjabis in 1861 and became 4th Battalion 14th Punjab Regiment in 1922. In 1947, it was allocated to the Pakistan Army, where it continues to exist as 8th Battalion The Punjab Regiment.

Early history
The regiment was raised on 5 June 1857, at Peshawar by Capt G N Kave during the upheaval of the Indian Mutiny, as the 16th Regiment of Punjab Infantry. The regiment participated in the Second Afghan War of 1878-80 and after taking part in Lord Roberts' 'Kabul to Kandahar' march, fought at the Battle of Kandahar on 1 September 1880. In 1897, during a general uprising of Pashtun tribes, the regiment was stationed at Malakand. In July, the garrison was attacked by hostile tribesmen, who were repulsed after a fierce engagement. Lieutenant Edmund Costello was awarded the Victoria Cross for conspicuous gallantry during the action. In 1900, the regiment was sent to China to suppress the Boxer Rebellion.

24th Punjabis
Subsequent to the reforms brought about in the Indian Army by Lord Kitchener in 1903, the regiment's designation was changed to 24th Punjabis.
During the First World War the regiment served in Egypt and then in Mesopotamia, where it fought the Battles of Shaiba, Ctesiphon and the Siege of Kut al Amara in 1915, where it was captured by the Turks. The 24th Punjabis returned to Mesopotamia in April 1917, after reforming, and fought in the Battle of Khan Baghdadi. They later served in Salonika and the Russian Transcaucasia.

Subsequent history
In 1921–22, a major reorganization was undertaken in the British Indian Army, leading to the formation of large infantry groups of four to six battalions. Among these was the 14th Punjab Regiment, formed by grouping the 24th Punjabis with the 19th, 20th, 21st and 22nd Punjabis, and the 40th Pathans. The battalion's new designation was 4th Battalion 14th Punjab Regiment. During the Second World War, the battalion fought in the Burma Campaign. In 1947, the 14th Punjab Regiment was allocated to Pakistan Army. In 1956, it was merged with the 1st, 15th and 16th Punjab Regiments to form one large Punjab Regiment, and 4/14th Punjab was redesignated as 8 Punjab. In 1948, the battalion fought in the war with India in Kashmir, while during the 1965 Indo-Pakistan War, it served in Lahore and Chhamb Sectors. In 1971, it fought in East Pakistan.

Genealogy
1857 16th Regiment of Punjab Infantry
1861 28th Regiment of Bengal Native Infantry
1861 24th Regiment of Bengal Native Infantry
1864 24th (Punjab) Regiment of Bengal Native Infantry
1885 24th (Punjab) Regiment of Bengal Infantry
1901 24th Punjab Infantry
1903 24th Punjabis
1922 4th Battalion 14th Punjab Regiment
1956 8th Battalion The Punjab Regiment

Prominent general officers 
Maj Gen Muhammad Mushtaq (DG Military Intelligence, GOC 11th Division, DG Rangers Sindh, GOC 21st Division)
Gen Muhammad Shariff(Late),Jiont Chief of Staff Committee
LtGen Muhammad Akam, VC UET Lahore 
MajGen Muhammad Arshad Ch (late)
LtGen Syed Ather Ali, Comd 5 Corps, Def Secy 
LtGen Khalid Rabbani, Comd 11 Corps, Chairman AWT
Maj Gen Khalid Zia, Designate GOC 33 Div
Maj Gen Mumtaz Hussain, Designate GOC 7 Div

See also
14th Punjab Regiment
Punjab Regiment

References

Further reading
Haig, Brodie. Fourteenth Punjab Regiment 1939-1945. London: Lund Humphries, n.d.
Rizvi, Brig SHA. (1984). Veteran Campaigners – A History of the Punjab Regiment 1759-1981. Lahore: Wajidalis.
Cardew, Lt FG. (1903). A Sketch of the Services of the Bengal Native Army to the Year 1895. Calcutta: Military Department.
 

British Indian Army infantry regiments
Punjab Regiment (Pakistan)
Indian World War I regiments
Military units and formations established in 1857
1857 establishments in India